William Henry Denson (March 4, 1846 – September 26, 1906) was a U.S. Representative from Alabama.

Born in Uchee, Alabama, Denson attended the common schools and the University of Alabama at Tuscaloosa.
Denson left the University of Alabama in 1863 to join the Confederate States Army, worked on his father's farm and studied law. He was admitted to the bar in 1868 and commenced practice in Union Springs, Alabama, moved to LaFayette, Alabama, in October 1870, served as mayor of Lafayette in 1874, served as member of the State house of representatives in 1876, moved to Gadsden, Etowah County, in 1877 and continued the practice of his profession. He was appointed by President Cleveland United States district attorney for the northern and middle districts of Alabama and served from June 30, 1885, to June 3, 1889. He served as chairman of the Democratic State convention in 1890.
Denson was elected as a Democrat to the Fifty-third Congress (March 4, 1893 – March 3, 1895). He was an unsuccessful candidate for renomination in 1894 and moved to Birmingham, Alabama, where he resumed the practice of law. He died in Birmingham, Alabama and was buried in Elmwood Cemetery.

References

External links

1846 births
1906 deaths
Confederate States Army personnel
Democratic Party members of the United States House of Representatives from Alabama
19th-century American politicians
People from Russell County, Alabama
United States Attorneys for the Middle District of Alabama
United States Attorneys for the Northern District of Alabama
Burials at Elmwood Cemetery (Birmingham, Alabama)